Golden Cap is a hill and cliff situated on the English Channel coast between Bridport and Charmouth in Dorset, England. At , it is arguably the highest point on the south coast of Great Britain (although the highest point is set back some 250m from the coastline) and is visible for tens of miles along the coastline. It is accessible via a coastal footpath from Seatown, and takes around 40 minutes to reach the summit.

The hill is owned by the National Trust and forms part of the Jurassic Coast, a World Heritage Site.

The base of the cliff is covered with large boulders, and is popular with fossil collectors. Storms have previously exposed fossilised ammonites and belemnites in the Blue Lias base.

The name derives from the distinctive outcropping of golden greensand rock present at the very top of the cliff.

Behind the cliff is Langdon Wood, a small wood of mainly Corsican Pine, planted in the 1950s, whose trees originate from a nearby copse known as "Eleanor's Clump". Langdon is owned by the National Trust, and encompasses a circular walk of approximately one mile.

As a result of its height, on a clear day views can extend to Portland Bill and to Start Point and Dartmoor in Devon.

References

External links
Golden Cap - official site at National Trust
Golden Cap and Seatown — Geology of the Wessex Coast by Ian West, Southampton University

Headlands of Dorset
Hills of Dorset
National Trust properties in Dorset
Nature reserves in Dorset
Jurassic Coast